Zeyd may refer to:
 Zeyid, Azerbaijan
 Zeyd, Ilam, Iran
 Bala Zeyd, Mazandaran Province, Iran
 Pain Zeyd, Mazandaran Province, Iran
 Zeyd, South Khorasan, Iran